Malkapur is a census town in Akola district in the Indian state of Maharashtra.

Demographics
 India census, Malkapur had a population of 12,486. Males constitute 51% of the population and females 49%. Malkapur has an average literacy rate of 79%, higher than the national average of 59.5%: male literacy is 84%, and female literacy is 74%. In Malkapur, 12% of the population is under 6 years of age.

References

Cities and towns in Akola district